The Diocese of Spokane is a Latin Church ecclesiastical territory or diocese of the Catholic Church in the U.S. state of Washington. Headquartered in Spokane, the diocese encompasses Okanogan, Ferry, Stevens, Pend Oreille, Lincoln, Spokane, Adams, Whitman, Franklin, Walla Walla, Columbia, Garfield and Asotin Counties. Its cathedral is the Cathedral of Our Lady of Lourdes in Spokane. On March 12, 2015, the Holy See announced Thomas Anthony Daly, the first auxiliary bishop of the Diocese of San José, to be the seventh Bishop of Spokane.

Canonically erected on December 17, 1913, the territories of the diocese were taken from what was then known as Diocese of Seattle. The diocese is a suffragan diocese in the ecclesiastical province of the metropolitan Archdiocese of Seattle; its metropolitan bishop is Paul Etienne.

Approximately 90,000 Catholics in Washington state are served by the Diocese.  There are 82 parishes in the diocese.

History
The Catholic Church presence in the present-day state of Washington dates to the 1830s, when missionary priests traveled from Quebec to minister in what was then known as the Oregon Country. On December 1, 1843, the Holy See established the Vicariate Apostolic of the Oregon Territory. In 1846 Pope Gregory XVI established an ecclesiastical territory in the region, and the apostolic vicariate was split into three dioceses: Oregon City, Vancouver Island, and Walla Walla.

The Whitman massacre in 1847 and the ensuing Cayuse War increased tensions between Christians and the native population of the Oregon Territory, and as a result by 1850 the Diocese of Walla Walla was abandoned and its territory administered from Oregon City. On May 31, 1850, Pope Pius IX created the Diocese of Nesqually out of the defunct Walla Walla diocese. The episcopal see was subsequently moved to Seattle, and the diocese was renamed the Diocese of Seattle in 1907.

With a growing population in Spokane and other areas of Eastern Washington, church leadership in Seattle realized that a new diocese needed to be formed, and the Diocese of Spokane was canonically erected by Pope Pius X on December 17, 1913. The diocese's first bishop was Augustine Francis Schinner, the bishop emeritus of the Diocese of Superior in Wisconsin, of which he was also the inaugural bishop. On June 23, 1951, the diocese lost territory when the Diocese of Yakima was formed.

Sex abuse and bankruptcy
In December 2004, the diocese declared bankruptcy, to protect it from claims from people abused by clergy. The diocese, as part of its bankruptcy, agreed to pay at least $48 million as compensation. The money for the settlement would come from insurance companies, the sale of church property, contributions from Catholic groups and from the diocese's parishes. In May 2012, an arrangement was made with mediators and litigants that settles outstanding claims, eliminates the need for further trials or appeals for all sides, and lessens the amount the Diocese must pay out to each of the parties, enabling the Diocese to avoid foreclosure on many of its parishes. In 2015, the Diocese was able to reach a settlement with its former legal firm during the bankruptcy process, thus avoiding trial.

Bishops

Bishops of Spokane
 Augustine Francis Schinner (1914–1925)
 Charles Daniel White (1926–1955)
 Bernard Joseph Topel (1955–1978)
 Lawrence Welsh (1978–1990), resigned; later appointed Auxiliary Bishop of Saint Paul and Minneapolis in 1991
 William S. Skylstad (1990–2010)
 Blase J. Cupich (2010–2014), appointed Archbishop of Chicago (Cardinal in 2016)
 Thomas Anthony Daly (2015–present)

Other priest of this diocese who became bishop
 William Joseph Condon, appointed Bishop of Great Falls in 1939

High schools
 Chesterton Academy of Notre Dame, Spokane 
 Desales Catholic High School, Walla Walla
 Gonzaga Preparatory School, Spokane
 Tri-Cities Prep, Pasco

Colleges
Gonzaga University, Spokane

Province
See: List of the Catholic bishops of the United States#Province of Seattle

See also

 Catholic Church by country
 Catholic Church in the United States
 Ecclesiastical Province of Seattle
 Global organisation of the Catholic Church
 List of Roman Catholic archdioceses (by country and continent)
 List of Roman Catholic dioceses (alphabetical) (including archdioceses)
 List of Roman Catholic dioceses (structured view) (including archdioceses)
 List of the Catholic dioceses of the United States

References

External links
Roman Catholic Diocese of Spokane Official Site

 
1913 establishments in Washington (state)
Christian organizations established in 1913
Spokane
Spokane
Spokane
Companies that filed for Chapter 11 bankruptcy in 2004